Mike De Palmer (October 17, 1961 – August 7, 2021) was a professional tennis player from the United States.  

De Palmer enjoyed most of his tennis success while playing doubles. During his career, he won six tour doubles titles and finished runner-up an additional six times. He achieved a career-high doubles ranking of world No. 20 in 1986.

DePalmer had a career high singles ranking of 35, with wins over Jimmy Connors, Vitas Gerulaitis, Mel Purcell, Peter Fleming, Peter Lundgren, Paul McNamee, Jakob Hlasek, and Tim Gullikson.  He reached the singles final in Ancona, Italy, in 1982, losing to Anders Järryd 6-3, 6-2.

De Palmer coached Boris Becker from August 1995 to June 1999, as well as coaching other professional tennis players.

De Palmer died in Knoxville, Tennessee on August 7, 2021 at the age of 59 because of complications from pancreatic cancer. His father coached the tennis team at the University of Tennessee from 1981 to 1994.

Grand Prix and WCT finals

Doubles: 12 (6 titles, 6 runner-ups)

References

External links
 
 

1961 births
2021 deaths
American male tennis players
Tennessee Volunteers men's tennis players
Tennis players from Tampa, Florida
Deaths from pancreatic cancer
Deaths from cancer in Tennessee